La Sidra is a monthly publication that has published the Cultural Association Ensame Sidreru since 2003 with Legal Deposit AS-03324-2003. The first issue was published in September 2003 and has since become the first thematic magazine on cider in Asturias. The magazine has organized an annual photo competition since 2012.

References

External links
 

Cider
Local interest magazines
Magazines established in 2003
Magazines published in Spain
Monthly magazines published in Spain
Food and drink magazines
2003 establishments in Spain